This is a list of members of the South Australian House of Assembly from 1918 to 1921, as elected at the 1918 state election:

 Alexandra Liberal MHA Archibald Peake died on 6 April 1920. Liberal candidate Herbert Hudd won the resulting by-election on 12 June.
 East Torrens MHA John Albert Southwood resigned from the National Party in 1920 and served out his term as an independent Labor member.
 Murray Liberal MHA Angas Parsons resigned on 5 January 1921. No by-election was held due to the proximity of the 1921 state election.
 Sturt Liberal MHA Edward Vardon resigned on 15 February 1921 in order to nominate for a casual vacancy in the Australian Senate. No by-election was held due to the proximity of the 1921 state election.

References

Members of South Australian parliaments by term
20th-century Australian politicians